Veliki Dubovik is a village in the municipality of Krupa na Uni, part of the Republika Srpska entity of Bosnia and Herzegovina.

Before the Bosnian War, the entire town of Veliki Dubovik was part of the Bosanska Krupa municipality, but after the Dayton Peace Agreement one part of the inhabited area became a part of municipality Krupa na Uni, divided by the Inter-Entity Boundary Line.

Demographics 
According to the 2013 census, its population was 28, all Serbs.

References

Populated places in Krupa na Uni